Oxyphyllomyia is a genus of flies in the family Tachinidae.

Species
 Oxyphyllomyia cordylurina Villeneuve, 1937

References

Tachinidae
Fauna of China